Métamorphoses is the thirteenth studio album by French electronic musician and composer Jean-Michel Jarre, released by Sony Music in 1999, Epic Records on January 24, 2000 and by Disques Dreyfus on May 25, 2004 in the U.S. The album was followed by two singles: "C'est la Vie" and "Tout Est Bleu".

Critical reception 
In Release Magazine, Niklas Forsberg wrote that "it is a musical flashback to a more enthusiastic and innovative Jean Michel Jarre" and added that "Jarre does it better when he's not influenced by anyone but himself." AllMusic writer, Thom Jurek described the album as "the most adventurous recording of Jarre's in a decade, and articulates his universal language of transcultural musicality and futuristic altruism fantastically."

Track listing

Personnel 
Adapted from album booklet:
 Jean Michel Jarre – vocals, processed vocals, keyboards, synthesizers
 Joachim Garraud – drum programming, sound design, additional keyboards
 Laurie Anderson – vocals on "Je me souviens"
 Natacha Atlas – vocals on "C'est la vie"
 Sharon Corr – violin on "Rendez-vous à Paris"
 Veronique Bossa – vocals on "Give Me a Sign" and "Millions of Stars"
 Dierdre Dubois – vocals on "Miss Moon"
 Lisa Jacobs – vocals on "Millions of Stars"
 Ozlem Cetin – vocals on "Silhouette"
 Olivier Constantin - vocals
 Leslie Jacobs - vocals
 Rabah Khalfa - bendir, darbouka
 Raphael Garraud – additional keyboards
 Christopher Papendieck – additional bass keyboards
 Francis Rimbert – additional keyboards
 John Davis - mastering
 Nuit de Chine	- art direction, graphic design
 Patrick Pelamourgues - technical assistance
 Jean Baptise Saudray - choir conductor
 Yvan Cassar - string arrangements

Charts

References

External links 
 Metamorphoses at Discogs

2000 albums
Jean-Michel Jarre albums